Stemmatophora gredalis is a species of snout moth in the genus Stemmatophora. It was described by Hans Zerny in 1935. It is found in Spain.

References

Moths described in 1935
Pyralini
Moths of Europe